Central Colorado is a region of the U.S. state of Colorado. Central Colorado is home to most of the population of the state and its geography is dominated by the Rocky Mountains, their foothills, mesas, and canyons, the rivers that run through them, and the open plains off the foothills. Central Colorado can be separated into two regions known as the north central region and the south central region. Central Colorado is home to the state's two largest cities, Denver and Colorado Springs. Central Colorado, has developed many campgrounds.

Counties

North Central counties
 Adams County
 Arapahoe County
 Clear Creek County
 Denver County
 Gilpin County
 Jefferson County
 Summit County

South Central counties
 Douglas County
 El Paso
 Park County
 Teller County

Larger Cities

North Central cities
 Aurora
 Black Hawk
 Central City
 Denver
 Georgetown
 Lakewood
 Fort Collins

South Central cities
 Castle Rock
 Colorado Springs
 Parker
 Woodland Park

References

Regions of Colorado